Stokken is a former municipality in the old Aust-Agder county in Norway.  The  municipality existed from 1919 until 1962 when it was merged into the newly-created Moland municipality. Today, the area is a part of the present-day municipality of Arendal in Agder county. The administrative centre of the municipality was the village of Eydehavn. The Stokken Church was the main church for the small municipality located just outside the town of Arendal.

History
Stokken was historically a part of the municipality of Østre Moland since the establishment of that municipality on 1 January 1838 (see formannskapsdistrikt law). The municipality of Stokken was established on 1 July 1919 when the old municipality of Østre Moland was divided into two separate municipalities: Stokken (population: 1,683) and Austre Moland (population: 1,289).

During the 1960s, there were many municipal mergers across Norway due to the work of the Schei Committee. On 1 January 1962, the municipalities of Stokken (population: 2,783), Austre Moland (population: 1,607), Flosta (population: 1,205), as well as the Strengereid area of Tvedestrand (population: 375) were merged to create the new municipality of Moland. Then on 1 January 1992, the municipality of Moland (including the area of Stokken) was merged into the neighboring municipality of Arendal.

Government
The municipal council  of Stokken was made up of 19 representatives that were elected to four year terms.  The party breakdown of the final municipal council was as follows:

See also
List of former municipalities of Norway

References

External links

Arendal
Former municipalities of Norway
1919 establishments in Norway
1962 disestablishments in Norway